Rinzia fumana, commonly known as the Polished rinzia, is a plant species of the family Myrtaceae endemic to Western Australia.

It blooms from July to October producing pink-white flowers.

It is found in the southern Wheatbelt extending into the Great Southern region of Western Australia where it grows in sandy-loam to clay-loam soils.

References

fumana
Endemic flora of Western Australia
Myrtales of Australia
Rosids of Western Australia
Plants described in 1843